Salomon Carrizales (born 8 February 1933) is a Venezuelan boxer. He competed in the men's light welterweight event at the 1952 Summer Olympics.

References

1933 births
Living people
Venezuelan male boxers
Olympic boxers of Venezuela
Boxers at the 1952 Summer Olympics
Place of birth missing (living people)
Light-welterweight boxers